Avelino "Sonny" Razon Jr. (born September 27, 1952) is a Filipino former police officer and politician who served as Chief of the Philippine National Police from October 1, 2007 to September 28, 2008. He also ran unsuccessfully for Mayor of Manila in 2010, supported by Asenso Manileño.

References

1952 births
Living people